The Pathfinder is a 1952 American historical western film adventure film directed by Sidney Salkow and starring George Montgomery, Helena Carter and Jay Silverheels. It is based on the 1840 novel The Pathfinder by James Fenimore Cooper and was produced by Sam Katzman for Columbia Pictures.

Plot
At the beginning of the French and Indian War in 1754, the Mingo Indians allied to the French massacre the Mohican tribe allied to British. Pathfinder and Chingachgook discover the only survivor, a child named Uncas. Angered that the British did not protect their allies the Mohicans, Pathfinder gains entry to the British fort and threatens the Scottish commander Colonel Duncannon until it is discovered that the British were unaware due to a Mohican messenger being killed before he could bring the news.

Colonel Duncannon enlists Pathfinder and Chingachgook to spy for the British by posing as French sympathisers. When Pathfinder says they would not be able to discover the plans of the French as they do not speak their language the Colonel assigns Alison, a fluent French speaker to them. Pathfinder is dismayed that Alison is a woman but she earns her place by killing a Mingo with a pistol and infiltrating French society when they arrive at the French fort. Alison discovers that the French have built a road along a mountain pass bringing supplies to the main French port that has a harbour for ships. Blowing up the mountain road with black powder would deny supplies to the French fort meaning all their smaller outposts would fall to the British due to a scarcity of provisions.

Alison came to the North American colonies to marry an English Captain who disgraced himself through alcoholism. She unexpectedly meets him again as he has turned renegade, married a Mingo princess and has a commission in the French army.

Cast
 George Montgomery as Pathfinder
 Helena Carter as Welcome Alison 
 Jay Silverheels as Chingachgook
 Walter Kingsford  Col. Duncannon 
 Rodd Redwing as Chief Arrowhead  
 Stephen Bekassy as Col. Brasseau  
 Elena Verdugo as Lokawa 
 Bruce Lester as Capt. Clint Bradford  
 Chief Yowlachie as Eagle Feather
 Lyle Talbot as French Ship Captain

Production
Helena Carter had just made The Golden Horde for Katzman.

References

External links
 
 
Review of film at Variety

1952 Western (genre) films
1952 films
Columbia Pictures films
Films based on American novels
Films based on works by James Fenimore Cooper
American spy films
Films directed by Sidney Salkow
American Western (genre) films
1950s English-language films
1950s American films